Chuchuyimlang is a village in Mokokchung District in the state of Nagaland in Northeast India. The village is divided into four sectors or "mopu", namely Longzung mopu, Teyong mopu, Impang mopu and Imlang Mopu. The "Compound Area" comes under different constituency though it is also a part of Chuchuyimlang village, it is also referred to as "Chuchu Town". Initially Chuchu yimlang village consisted of only Imlang, Impang and Mongta(Teyong) mopu, Longzung which was altogether a different village later merged with Chuchuyimlang. The census of 2001 shows that it has overtaken Ungma as the largest Ao  village. It lies on National Highway 61, about 30 km from the heart of Mokokchung town. It is a famous destination for the celebration of Moatsu Mong as it is the only Ao village which invites people from neighbouring trans Dikhu tribes during the festival. Non citizens (of the village) are not allowed in other Ao villages during Moatsu.

The Census of 2001 puts the population of the Chuchuyimlang at 9,524. Out of this 7,846 reside in Chuchuyimlang village while 1,678 reside in Chuchuyimlang Compound.

See also
 Natwar Thakkar, person who established first Gandhi Ashram in Nagaland in Chuchuyimlang village

References 
Chuchuyimlang

Ao villages
Villages in Mokokchung district